Solomon Okpako (born 1 May 1990) is a Nigerian footballer who currently plays for Nigeria Premier League side Enugu Rangers.

Career
Okpako started his career 2003 on the youth side for Bendel United and was at age 15 promoted to the senior team. He left after  one-season to sign for Nigeria Premier League club Kano Pillars F.C., in January 2006. He currently stars for seven time Nigeria champions Enyimba International F.C., since January 2017.

International career 
Okpako was called into camp for the Nigeria U-20 team prior to the 2009 FIFA World Youth Championship in Egypt but did not make coach Samson Siasia's final squad. He was called up for the camp prior to the 2010 FIFA World Cup in South Africa under Coach Lars Lagerback after helping the Eagles B team win the 2010 WAFU Cup.

References

External links

1990 births
Living people
Nigerian footballers
Nigerian expatriate footballers
Kano Pillars F.C. players
Association football midfielders
Mamelodi Sundowns F.C. players
Expatriate footballers in Greece
Expatriate soccer players in South Africa
Panionios F.C. players
Chippa United F.C. players
Santos F.C. (South Africa) players
Enyimba F.C. players
Rangers International F.C. players
Bendel United F.C. players